The  next leadership election for ANO 2011 is expected to be held in 2024. The incumbent leader Andrej Babiš stated that he won't run for another term in 2024.

Background
Andrej Babiš led the party since establishment of the party in 2011. Last leadership election was held on 12 February 2022 with Babiš being reelected. Babiš announced during his speech that ANO 2011 has to look for his successor: "In 2024, you must elect a new chairman who will become the new face and new leader of our movement and lead ANO 2011 to the next legislative elections in 2025." CNN Prima News reported that members of the party have already started looking for Babiš' successor with Karel Havlíček and Ivo Vondrák being main candidates. Vondrák himself confirmed his intention to succeed Babiš in 2024. Various media also speculated that election might be held sooner than 2024 due to potential Babiš' candidacy in 2023 Czech presidential election.

Following 2023 Czech presidential election, Novinky.cz reported that sources from within the party stated that Babiš intends for Karel Havlíček to become his successor. On 8 February 2023, Babiš announced that Havlíček will become Shadow Prime Minister in the Shadow Cabinet of ANO 2011. On 24 February 2023 Vondrák left ANO 2011 and thus became ineligible to run.

Potential candidates
 Andrej Babiš, the incumbent leader stated that he won't run but some political scientists such as Jiří Pehe believe that he will change his mind. On 21 September 2022 Babiš stated that he might eventually run for leadership in 2024 despite ruling it out previously.
 Karel Havlíček, MP and former Minister of Industry and Trade and former Minister of Transport.

References

ANO 2011 leadership elections
Future elections in the Czech Republic
Indirect elections